Edmilson Silva Costa (born 8 April 1950 in Pedreiras) is a Brazilian economist, college professor and politician affiliated to the Brazilian Communist Party (PCB), serving as the party's General Secretary. He is a Doctor of Economics at the State University of Campinas.

Biography

In 1992, after defending the thesis A Política Salarial no Brasil, 1964-1985: 21 anos de arrocho salarial e acumulação predatória (The Wage Policy in Brazil, 1964-1985: 21 years of wage squeeze and predatory accumulation), under the supervision of Waldir da Silva Quadros, professor of Economist at the State University of Campinas, he became Doctor of Economist at Unicamp.

He was a candidate for Mayor of São Paulo for the Communist Party in 2008.

On 26 April 2010, Costa was announced as candidate for Vice President of Brazil in the 2010 elections, along with then-General Secretary Ivan Pinheiro.

On 17 October 2016, he became General Secretary of the Brazilian Communist Party, replacing Ivan Pinheiro.

Works

References

External links

|-

1950 births
Living people
State University of Campinas alumni
Maranhão politicians
Candidates for Vice President of Brazil
Brazilian communists